Kingston is an unincorporated community in Decatur County, Indiana, in the United States.

History
Kingston was laid out in 1851.

References

Unincorporated communities in Decatur County, Indiana
Unincorporated communities in Indiana